John Donovan DeWitt (born November 13, 1970) is an American chiropractor and former arena football offensive line / defensive lineman. He played college football at Vanderbilt.

Professional career
After going undrafted in the 1994 NFL Draft, he tried out for the San Francisco 49ers. He then joined the Houston Oilers in 1995. On August 23, 1995, he was waived by the Oilers.

DeWitt was drafted in the fourth round (19th overall) of the 1996 World League Draft by the Scottish Claymores of the World League of American Football (later NFL Europe). He spent 1997, with the newly formed Nashville Kats of the Arena Football League (AFL). That season, he recorded 11 tackles, one sack, two pass break-ups, and two fumble recoveries. In 1998, he returned to the Scottish Claymores.

In 1999, DeWitt returned to arena football, joining the Buffalo Destroyers. That season, he recorded 12 tackles, 1.5 sacks, one pass break-up, one forced fumble, two fumble recoveries. In 2000, he recorded seven tackles, one sack, and two fumble recoveries. He joined the San Francisco Demons of the short-lived XFL as a member of their practice squad. He later joined the Las Vegas Outlaws. While in the XFL, he recorded seven tackles. He then joined the Montreal Alouettes of the Canadian Football League (CFL). While with the Alouettes, he appeared in three games and recorded four tackles. He then returned to the Arena Football League (AFL) for the 2001 season joining the Los Angeles Avengers. For the season, he recorded two tackles. For the 2002 season, he recorded one tackle, one sack, and one pass break-up. In 2003, he recorded 12 tackles, one sack, and three pass break-ups. In 2004, he joined the Las Vegas Gladiators. For the season, he recorded nine tackles, 0.5 sacks, and one pass break-up.

Coaching career
After a failed try out with the San Francisco 49ers, DeWitt returned to his alma mater Southside High School to help coach the football team.

Post-football career
DeWitt graduated from Southern California University of Health Sciences and became a board certified chiropractor at Bergman Family Chiropractic.

References

1970 births
Living people
American football offensive linemen
American football defensive linemen
Canadian football defensive linemen
American players of Canadian football
Houston Oilers players
Scottish Claymores players
Nashville Kats players
Buffalo Destroyers players
Montreal Alouettes players
San Francisco Demons players
Las Vegas Outlaws (XFL) players
Los Angeles Avengers players
Las Vegas Gladiators players
High school football coaches in Arkansas
Players of American football from Arkansas
Sportspeople from Fort Smith, Arkansas